Sir Thomas Smith, 1st Baronet (ca. 162222 May 1675) was an English politician who sat in the House of Commons between 1661 and 1675.

Smith was the son of Sir Thomas Smith, of Hatherton, Cheshire and his wife Mary Smith, daughter of Sir Hugh Smith, of Long Ashton, Somerset. He was created baronet of Hatherton on 16 August 1660.

In 1661, Smith was elected Member of Parliament for Chester in the Cavalier Parliament and sat until his death in 1675.

Smith married Abigail Pate, daughter of Sir John Pate, Bt of Sysonby, Leicestershire. They had a daughter Frances, but no son. The baronetcy was inherited by his nephew Thomas and became extinct on his death.

References

1620s births
1675 deaths

Year of birth uncertain
People from Somerset
English MPs 1661–1679
Cavaliers
Baronets in the Baronetage of England